Kenneth McMillan may refer to:

Kenneth G. McMillan, United States politician (R-IL) 
Kenneth McMillan (actor) (1932–1989), American actor (sometimes credited as Ken McMillan)

See also
Kenneth MacMillan, British ballet dancer and choreographer